Dilara Türk (born July 30, 1996) is a Turkish-German female football midfielder currently playing in the German 2. Bundesliga for 1. FC Lübars with jersey number 16. She is part of the Turkey women's U-19 and Turkey women's team.

Family life
Dilara Türk was born to Turkish immigrant parents in Kulmbach, Germany on July 30, 1996. In 2015, she plans to work at the Frankfurt Airport after her graduation from the vocational school.

Playing career

Club
Dilara Türk began her football career at the youth team of 1. FC Nürnberg. she played five years in the team, which is the second force in Bavaria at youth level behind FC Bayern Munich. She became a member of the Bavaria selection. Considered one of the greatest women's football talents in Upper Franconia skilled in speed, technique and overview, she lost her joy for football and took a half-year break from sport. In the summer of 2014, she returned to play in the German 2. Bundesliga South for ETSV Würzburg. She capped 17 times in the 2014–15 season. Currently, the midfielder is a member of 1. FC Lübars, which competes also in the German 2. Bundesliga.

International
At age 13 only in 2010, Dilara Türk's vision was to be a member of the German women's national football team.

She was admitted to the Turkey women's U-19, debuting in the friendly match against Bosnia and Herzegovina on March 17, 2015.

Dilara Türk played the first time for the Turkey women's team in the UEFA Women's Euro 2017 qualifying Group 5 match against Croatia on September 17, 2015. She capped in five matches of the tournament.

References

External links
 

1996 births
People from Kulmbach
Sportspeople from Upper Franconia
German people of Turkish descent
German women's footballers
Turkish women's footballers
Turkey women's international footballers
Women's association football midfielders
Living people
1. FC Lübars players
Footballers from Bavaria